Lukáš Droppa (born 22 April 1989) is a Czech footballer who plays as a midfielder for Romanian Liga I club FC Voluntari.

Career

Club
On 13 July 2016, he signed a two-year contract with the Russian side Tom Tomsk.

On 21 January 2017, he moved to Turkey, signing a 1.5-year contract with Bandırmaspor.

On 26 June 2019, Droppa left Shakhter Karagandy and a day later signed with Romanian Liga I side Gaz Metan Mediaș.

International
Droppa got his first call up to the senior Czech Republic side for 2018 FIFA World Cup qualifiers against Germany and Azerbaijan in October 2016.

International stats

Honours

Slovan Bratislava
Slovak Cup: 2017–18

FC Voluntari
Cupa României runner-up: 2021–22

References

External links
 
 

1989 births
Living people
People from Uherské Hradiště
Czech footballers
Czech Republic international footballers
Association football midfielders
Czech First League players
Czech National Football League players
AC Sparta Prague players
FC Sellier & Bellot Vlašim players
FC Baník Ostrava players
Ekstraklasa players
Śląsk Wrocław players
Liga I players
CS Pandurii Târgu Jiu players
CS Gaz Metan Mediaș players
FC Voluntari players
Russian Premier League players
FC Tom Tomsk players
TFF First League players
Bandırmaspor footballers
Slovak Super Liga players
ŠK Slovan Bratislava players
Kazakhstan Premier League players
FC Shakhter Karagandy players
Czech expatriate footballers
Czech expatriate sportspeople in Poland
Expatriate footballers in Poland
Czech expatriate sportspeople in Romania
Expatriate footballers in Romania
Czech expatriate sportspeople in Russia
Expatriate footballers in Russia
Czech expatriate sportspeople in Turkey
Expatriate footballers in Turkey
Czech expatriate sportspeople in Slovakia
Expatriate footballers in Slovakia
Czech expatriate sportspeople in Kazakhstan
Expatriate footballers in Kazakhstan
Czech Republic youth international footballers
Sportspeople from the Zlín Region